Samuel Moore (1 December 1838 – 20 July 1911) was an English translator, lawyer and colonial administrator. He is best known for the first English translation of Das Kapital and the only authorised translation of The Communist Manifesto which was commissioned, thoroughly verified and supplied with footnotes by Friedrich Engels. Moore also wrote a summary of a notebook by Marx which was published as Chapter III of the third volume of Das Kapital.

References 

1838 births
1911 deaths
English translators
19th-century British translators
19th-century English lawyers